The Hiroshima Mathematical Journal is an open-access mathematics journal that continues the Journal of Science of the Hiroshima University, Series A (1930–1960) and Journal of Science of the Hiroshima University, Series A - I (1961–1970). The journal contains original research papers in pure and applied mathematics. Each annual volume has had three issues since 1974.

External links
Official website

Mathematics journals
Hiroshima University
Triannual journals
Open access journals
Publications established in 1930